Lone Walker Mountain is located in the Lewis Range, Glacier National Park in the U.S. state of Montana. Lone Walker Mountain is situated immediately southwest of Upper Two Medicine Lake along the Continental Divide.

Climate
Based on the Köppen climate classification, it is located in an alpine subarctic climate zone with long, cold, snowy winters, and cool to warm summers. Temperatures can drop below −10 °F with wind chill factors below −30 °F.

Geology

Like other mountains in Glacier National Park, it is composed of sedimentary rock laid down during the Precambrian to Jurassic periods.

See also
 Mountains and mountain ranges of Glacier National Park (U.S.)

References

Lone Walker Mountain
Mountains of Glacier National Park (U.S.)
Lewis Range
Mountains of Montana